|}

The Grand Prix d'Automne is a Group 1 hurdle race in France which is open to horses aged five years or older. It is run at Auteuil over a distance of 4,800 metres (about 3 miles), and it is scheduled to take place each year in late October or early November.

History
The race was first run in 1929 as an autumn counterpart to the Grand Prix du Printemps, a handicap race run at the same course in spring. The Grand Prix d'Automne, however, was a weight-for-age event until becoming a handicap in 1940 before reverting to weight-for-age in 1990. Originally run over 3,800 metres race has been run over a variety of distances. The race was run over 4100 metres between 1930 and 1938, 4000 metres from 1940 to 1942, 4500 metres from 1943 to 1967, 4600 metres in 1968, 4300 metres in 1969, 4100 metres from 1970 to 1990 and 4800 metres since 1991. The race was open to four-year-olds until 1989.

The race was not run in 1939.

Records
Leading horses (4 wins):
 Galop Marin (2018, 2019, 2020,2021)

Leading jockey (4 wins):
 Morgan Regairaz - Galop Marin (2018, 2019, 2020,2021)

Leading trainer (8 wins):
 William Head – Filidor (1931), Evohé (1934, 1936, 1937), Daring (1944), Vatelys (1946), Blue Butterfly (1947), Maisons-Laffitte (1951)

Leading owner (4 wins):
 Mme Patrick Papot - Galop Marin (2018, 2019, 2020,2021)

Winners since 1997

Earlier winners

 1929 – Le Bouif
 1930 – Hoca
 1931 – Filidor/ Rebenti (dead heat)
 1932 – Port Said
 1933 – Prince Oli
 1934 – Evohé
 1935 – Anonyme
 1936 – Evohé
 1937 – Evohé
 1938 – Barboteur
 1939 – no race
 1940 – Duralumet
 1941 – Cocktail
 1942 – Kargal
 1943 – Quibus
 1944 – Daring
 1945 – Houdon
 1946 – Vatelys
 1947 – Blue Butterfly
 1948 – Tyran
 1949 – Pyrrhus
 1950 – Pyrrhus
 1951 – Maisons-Laffitte
 1952 – Prosper
 1953 – Eole
 1954 – James Stuart
 1955 – Méhariste
 1956 – Méhariste
 1957 – Romantisme
 1958 – Ming
 1959 – Marivaux
 1960 – Sweater
 1961 – Marivaux
 1962 – Liberty's
 1963 – Novio
 1964 – Sapin
 1965 – Pansa
 1966 – Rivoli
 1967 – Silvor
 1968 - Francois Saubaber
 1969 – Arrondi
 1970 – Tim
 1971 – Hardatit
 1972 – Roy du Sillon
 1973 – Dulcio
 1974 – Porto Rafti
 1975 – Soyor
 1976 – Quart de Vin
 1977 – Manor
 1978 – Tetrac
 1979 – Pavo Real
 1980 – Pavino
 1981 – Whit
 1982 – Nous Aussi
 1983 – Gelas
 1984 – Fils de Reine
 1985 – Cutty Sark Memory
 1986 – Duke of Riva
 1987 – Oteuil
 1988 – Reve Bleu
 1989 – Afkal
 1990 – Rose or No
 1991 – El Triunfo
 1992 – Vieux Bourbon
 1993 – Bitwood
 1994 – Algan
 1995 – Topkar
 1996 – Royal Chance

See also
 List of French jump horse races

References
 france-galop.com – A Brief History: Grand Prix d'Automne.
 pedigreequery.com – Grand Prix d'Automne – Auteuil.

References
 France Galop / Racing Post:

Horse races in France
Recurring events established in 1929
National Hunt hurdle races